Tsai Hong-tu (born 1 August 1952) is a Taiwanese businessman and banker. He is a son of Tsai Wan-lin, the former richest person of Taiwan who died in 2004.

Business career
Tsai Hong-tu is the chairman of the board of Cathay Financial Holdings. Inherited stakes of the company with brothers Tsai Cheng-da and T. Y. Tsai when father Tsai Wan-lin died in 2004. Family also controls Cathay Real Estate, a Taiwan property developer. In 2010's Forbes World's Billionaires List, Tsai was ranked no. 582 in the world, side by side with brothers Tsai Cheng-da and T. Y. Tsai, each with individual net worth of 1.7 Billion US Dollar.

Cathay Financial Holdings
Cathay Financial Holding operates its businesses through banking business, which involves in deposit, loan, electronic financial services, credit card business, foreign exchange trading, trust and wealth management, financial trading and financial services, among others; life insurance business, which provides life insurance, injury insurance, health insurance, annuity insurance and investment insurance; property insurance business, which offers automobile insurance, fire insurance, flood insurance, engineering insurance and other insurances; security business, which involves in stock broking and underwriting, as well as capital investment business, which offers security distribution, investment and management consulting services.

References

1952 births
Living people
Taiwanese bankers
Taiwanese billionaires
Tsai family of Miaoli